This is a list of incidents Israelis and Palestinians in 2011 as part of the Israeli–Palestinian conflict.

January

February

March

April

May

June

August

September

October

See also 

List of armed conflicts and attacks, 2011
List of Palestinian rocket attacks on Israel, 2011
List of Israeli assassinations

References 

2011 in Israel
2011 in the Palestinian territories
Israeli-Palestinian conflict
Israeli-Palestinian conflict
2011
2011
2011
Terrorist incidents in Israel in 2011
2011